The 2015 Singapore League Cup (known as the TNP League Cup for sponsorship reasons) was the ninth season of Singapore's premier club football tournament organised by the Football Association of Singapore.  DPMM FC were the defending champions, having won their third trophy the previous year. Albirex Niigata (S) were the eventual winners after defeating 2013 champions Balestier Khalsa 2–1 in the finals.

Unlike the previous three tournaments held in 2012, 2013 and 2014, the League Cup Plate Competition between the third-placing teams in each group after the group stages were cancelled from 2015 onward.

Teams

A total of 10 teams participated in the 2015 Singapore League Cup, eight S.League clubs and two National Football League clubs. Courts Young Lions and Harimau Muda B did not participate in this year's edition of the Singapore League Cup.

  Albirex Niigata (S)
 Balestier Khalsa
  DPMM FC
 Geylang International
 Home United
 Hougang United
 Singapore Recreation Club
 Sporting Westlake
 Tampines Rovers
 Warriors FC

Group stage

Group A

Group B

Group C

Knockout phase

Bracket

Semi-finals

Final

Statistics

Top scorers 

Source:S.League

Winners

See also
 S.League
 Singapore FA Cup
 Singapore Cup
 Singapore Charity Shield
 Football Association of Singapore
 List of football clubs in Singapore

References

2015
League Cup
2015 domestic association football cups
June 2015 sports events in Asia
July 2015 sports events in Asia